Barbara Kantorová (born March 3, 1992 in Poprad, Slovakia) is an alpine skier from Slovakia. She competed for Slovakia at the 2014 Winter Olympics in the alpine skiing events.

World Cup results

Season standings

Results per discipline

Standings through 21 December 2020

World Championship results

Olympic results

References

1992 births
Living people
Olympic alpine skiers of Slovakia
Alpine skiers at the 2014 Winter Olympics
Alpine skiers at the 2018 Winter Olympics
Sportspeople from Poprad
Slovak female alpine skiers
Universiade medalists in alpine skiing
Universiade silver medalists for Slovakia
Universiade bronze medalists for Slovakia
Competitors at the 2013 Winter Universiade
Competitors at the 2017 Winter Universiade